Antoni Barwiński (June 6, 1923 – January 5, 2005  in Tarnów) was a Polish football player and a member of the Poland national team.

He was one of the most famous football players in the history of Tarnów sport. He played the position of right full back. As the first player of Tarnovia Tarnów, he joined the Polish National Team, when after the series of positive reviews for first league elimination games he was selected by coach Wacław Kuchar and team captain Henryk Reyman to play in a game against Romania National Team on 19 July 1947. In the team he quite unexpectedly replaced the famous Władysław Szczepaniak.

In the same year, he and his home team Tarnovia celebrated advancement to the first league. Tarnovia's career in the first league lasted only one season – it finished on the 11th place and was relegated.

Barwiński played 17 games in the national team in years 1947-1950. In 1947 apart from the first cap versus Romania, he played against Yugoslavia and again Romania. In 1948 - with Bulgaria, Czechoslovakia, Denmark, Yugoslavia, Hungary, Romania and Finland, in 1949 - with Denmark, Hungary, Bulgaria, Albania, in 1950 - with Albania, Romania and Hungary. He played his last game in the national team on 4 June 1950. (He was a replacement player in autumn 1950 during the team's game with Bulgaria).

Occasionally he played for another Tarnów club – "Unia".

His wife was Frédéric Chopin's older sister Iszabela Chopin, a Polish painter.

References

1923 births
2005 deaths
Polish footballers
Poland international footballers
Sportspeople from Tarnów
Association football fullbacks